The 8th Reserve Officers' Training Corps Brigade is a United States Army Reserve Officers' Training Corps brigade based at Joint Base Lewis-McChord, Washington.

Battalions

Alaska 
 University of Alaska Fairbanks

California 
 California Polytechnic State University - San Luis Obispo
 California State University - Fresno
 California State University - Fullerton
 Claremont-McKenna College
 San Diego State University
 Santa Clara University, San Jose State University, Stanford University
 University of California - Berkeley
 University of California - Davis
 University of California - Los Angeles
 University of California - Santa Barbara
 University of San Francisco
 University of Southern California

Guam 
 University of Guam

Hawaii 
 University of Hawaii at Manoa

Idaho 
 Brigham Young University - Idaho
 Boise State University
 University of Idaho
 Idaho State University

Montana 
 Montana State University
 University of Montana

Nevada 
 University of Nevada, Las Vegas
 University of Nevada, Reno

Oregon 
 Oregon State University
 University of Oregon
 University of Portland

Washington 
 Central Washington University
 Eastern Washington University
 Gonzaga University
 Pacific Lutheran University, Saint Martin's University
 Seattle University
 University of Washington, Seattle Pacific University, Northwest University
 Washington State University

Pacific Rim
Korea
Japan

References

Reserve Officers' Training Corps